A five-cent coin or five-cent piece is a small-value coin minted for various decimal currencies using the cent as their hundredth subdivision.

Examples include:
 the United States five-cent coin, better known as the US nickel
 the Canadian five-cent coin, better known as the Canadian nickel
 the Australian five-cent coin
 the New Zealand five-cent coin (withdrawn in 2006 due to low monetary value)
 the Hong Kong five-cent coin (withdrawn in 1989 due to low monetary value)
 the Singapore five-cent coin
 the Brunei five-cent coin
 the five-cent coin of the decimal Dutch guilder (Netherlands), also called stuiver (withdrawn in 2001 due to introduction of the euro)
 the 5 cent euro coin used in several European countries known as the eurozone
 the five-cent coin of the South African rand

See also
:Category:Five-cent coins